Joseph Ball Allon (born 12 November 1966) is an English former footballer. A striker, he scored 135 goals in 361 league and cup games in a 14-year career in the English Football League.

Starting his career with Newcastle United in 1984, he failed to break into the first team and moved on to Swansea City three years later. After a season with the Swans he signed with Hartlepool United. After scoring 50 league goals for the club he transferred to Chelsea in 1991. After a season with Chelsea, including a loan spell with Port Vale, he joined Brentford. In 1994, he moved back to Port Vale permanently, before moving back to Hartlepool United via Lincoln City in 1995. He retired in 1998 because of a knee injury. He won three promotions with three clubs, and was voted onto the Fourth Division PFA Team of the Year in 1990–91 and won the North-East Footballer of the Year award in 1990-91.

Career

Newcastle United
A forward, Allon started his professional career with Newcastle United in 1984, at a time when Jack Charlton was manager at St James' Park. At the end of 1984–85 he starred in the FA Youth Cup final victory over Watford, scoring twice in a game in which Paul Gascoigne also netted a wonder goal. Allon scored twice in nine First Division games in 1985–86 and 1986–87, before manager Willie McFaul moved him on to Swansea City in August 1987.

Swansea City
Terry Yorath's Swans won promotion out of the Fourth Division in 1987–88 after beating Torquay United 5–4 on aggregate in the play-off final. During the season Allon also scored against rivals Cardiff City in the South Wales derby, in a 2–2 draw at Vetch Field on New Year's Day. He scored 12 times in 40 league and cup appearances in a partnership with Colin Pascoe, before he returned to the North-East to join Hartlepool United in November 1988, as one of Bobby Moncur's first signings as manager. Moncur drove from Hartlepool to South Wales to watch the striker in a reserve game and decided to sign him.

Hartlepool United
Pools paid a nominal fee for the striker to bring him back to the North East. Pools struggled near the foot of the Football League in 1988–89 under Moncur, and Allon scored just five goals in 26 starts. The team again struggled in 1989–90, and suffered a number of heavy defeats under Moncur – losing 7–1 at York, 6–1 at Aldershot and 6–0 at home to Doncaster. As Pools improved in the second half of the season and moved off bottom spot after being rooted there with 9 points from 18 games, Allon managed 17 goals in 45 league starts to become the club's joint top-scorer with strike partner Paul Baker. New boss Cyril Knowles was the catalyst for change as he turned the club's fortunes around. Allon enjoyed a reunion with his former Newcastle United teammate Gascoigne in September 1990 as Pools played Tottenham Hotspur in the League Cup. Gascoigne netted 4 in a 5–0 White Hart Lane defeat for Pools, who lost the second-leg 2–1 at the Victoria Ground. 

Allon netted the winning goal for Pools at Feethams in November 1990, as Pools beat rivals Darlington 1–0. By scoring the winning goal at Feethams in 1997, the striker holds the distinction of being the only Pools striker to have twice scored a winning goal in front of the Tin Shed, the favoured end for supporters of Darlington. 

Allon netted 35 times as Pools won promotion in 1990–91 for only the second time in their history. Pools  finished third, but were only one point behind champions Darlington. Allon hit 35 goals in 55 games in the campaign, and was named Hennessey Cognac North East Player of the Year and North East Football Writers Player of the Year, and was also voted onto the PFA Team of the Year.

Chelsea
His form that season earned him a move to top-flight side Chelsea in August 1991, with manager Ian Porterfield paying a fee reported to be £250,000. Middlesbrough were also interested in his services that summer. Allon scored at home on his Chelsea debut, at the Shed End, however, he failed to make an impact at Stamford Bridge, and in February of the 1991–92 season he joined Port Vale on loan, but made just six goalless appearances for John Rudge's Valiants, who struggled in vain to avoid relegation out of the Second Division. He only stayed for a few months of 1992–93, the inaugural season of the Premier League. It was rumoured that his friendship with Vinnie Jones led him astray and helped to bring about his poor form. In all he started just four games (with a further 14 substitute appearances) and scored three goals for the Blues. He was sold to Brentford in November 1992 for a club-record incoming fee of £275,000.

Brentford
The "Bees" were relegated out of the First Division at the end of the 1992–93 season under Phil Holder. He scored a total of 28 goals in 56 league and cup appearances at Griffin Park. He also had a brief spell on loan at Southend United in September 1993.

Port Vale
Allon moved to back Port Vale – this time permanently – in March 1994. He scored twice in what remained of the 1993–94 campaign, helping the club to win promotion out of the Second Division. He bagged seven goals at Vale Park in 1994–95, before he was sold to Third Division side Lincoln City for £42,500 in July 1995.

Lincoln City and return to Hartlepool
After just five games and three months at Sincil Bank he was on the move again, during which manager Sam Ellis was replaced by John Beck, and returned to Victoria Park when Hartlepool manager Keith Houchen splashed out £40,000. He scored nine goals in 24 games in 1995–96 to become joint top-scorer, but a persistent knee injury restricted his first team appearances. He scored 11 goals in 34 games in 1996–97 to again become the club's top-scorer, as Hartlepool finished just four points above the bottom of the Football League under the stewardship of Mick Tait. His goal spree towards the end of the season helped the club to avoid a drop into the Conference. He only made it onto the pitch five times in 1997–98, but still found the net twice, both against Colchester at Victoria Park, before he retired due to injury. His total of 79 goals for Hartlepool puts him in seventh place in their overall list of top scorers. He remains a Pools' hero for his exploits in 1990-91.

Post-retirement
After retiring from football, Allon presented an award-winning BBC Inside Out documentary on grassroots sport, and worked as a summariser at BBC Tees radio. Between 2006 and 2008 Allon worked under ex-Chelsea teammate Dennis Wise on the coaching staff at Leeds United. He suffered a mental breakdown following the death of his mother due to Alzheimer's disease in 2007. He has been a regular on the North East after-dinner circuit and has penned a play paying tribute to the life of his former Newcastle United boss Jack Charlton.

Career statistics
Source:

Honours
Newcastle United
FA Youth Cup: 1985

Swansea City
Football League Fourth Division play-offs: 1988

Hartlepool United
Football League Fourth Division third-place promotion: 1990–91

Port Vale
Football League Second Division second-place promotion: 1993–94

Individual
PFA Team of the Year: 1990–91 Fourth Division
Hennessey Cognac North East Player of the Year: 1990–91
North East Football Writers Player of the Year: 1990–91

References

Living people
1966 births
Footballers from Gateshead
English footballers
Association football forwards
Newcastle United F.C. players
Swansea City A.F.C. players
Hartlepool United F.C. players
Chelsea F.C. players
Port Vale F.C. players
Brentford F.C. players
Southend United F.C. players
Lincoln City F.C. players
English Football League players
Premier League players
Association football coaches
Leeds United F.C. non-playing staff